Émilien Amaury (5 March 1909, in Étampes, France – 2 January 1977, in Chantilly) was a French publishing magnate whose company now organises the Tour de France. He worked with Philippe Pétain, head of the French government in the southern half of France during the second world war but used his position to find paper and other materials for the French Resistance. His links with Jacques Goddet, the organiser of the Tour de France, led to a publishing empire that included the daily sports paper, L'Équipe. Amaury died after falling from his horse; his will led to six years of legal debate.

Background
Émilien Amaury was born in modest circumstances in the town of Étampes. He left both his school and his family at 12. (Other sources say he left at 10) He began work as a bicycle delivery boy, worked in a bar, then joined the army in compulsory military service. On leaving the army he became at 19 secretary to Marc Sangnier, a journalist and politician, going from there in 1930 to found the OPG, the Office de Publicité Générale, which handled advertising for several Christian-Democrat newspapers. In 1937 he became technical adviser to the Minister for the Colonies, Marius Moutet.

War and Resistance
France declared war against Germany in 1939. Amaury was conscripted into the cavalry in 1938 and was awarded the Croix de Guerre, but he was captured when Germany invaded the Ardennes in 1940. He escaped soon afterwards and returned to Paris. The government collapsed with the invasion and a new state was declared, with its headquarters at Vichy. Its leader, Philippe Pétain, put Amaury in charge of propaganda for the well-being of the family. Amaury, however, had been in contact with an early Resistant, Henri Honoré d'Estienne d'Orves, and through him had helped start the Rue de Lille Group, a Parisian cell of the growing Resistance movement in which Amaury took the code names Jupiter and Champin. He used his government position to procure paper – which was rationed – for Resistance newspapers and to supply other material. The paper he procured made it possible to print 30,000 and sometimes 100,000 copies of news sheets such as Résistance, L'Humanité and Témoignage Chrétien.

The Rue de Lille Group – named after a street in Paris – also printed the text of General Charles de Gaulle's broadcast to France on the BBC of 18 June 1940, and printed forged documents for Resistance members.

Origins of press empire
Newspapers and magazines which had continued to publish during the Occupation were closed down and their possessions sequestrated by the State at the end of the war. The way was open to new entrepreneurs and to those whose reputations had survived the war years.

Among the newspapers closed had been the sports daily, L'Auto, which had founded the Tour de France in 1903. The editor, Jacques Goddet, had refused to run the race when the Germans invited him to but his paper printed news favourable to the occupiers, many of its shares were held by Nazi sympathisers, and Goddet himself had been a supporter of Pétain. He was able to show that L'Auto's print works, through its head, Roger Roux, had clandestinely produced news sheets for the Resistance generally and for Amaury in particular. An inquiry absolved Goddet of collaboration and, through Amaury's interest, allowed Goddet to open another newspaper, L'Équipe, and to run the Tour de France. Both the paper and the race later became part of Amaury's business network.

Amaury's first publication, however, building on the wreckage of the collaborationist press, was a weekly, Carrefour ("crossroads"), in August 1944. His links with the Ligue Féminine d'Action Catholique led to the foundation of Marie-France, which he later edited. He also created the Syndicat de la Presse Hebdomadaire Parisienne ("Parisian weekly press union", later known as the Syndicat Professionnel de la Presse Magazine et d'Opinion), and was elected its president for 33 successive years.

Amaury founded a daily paper, Le Parisien Libéré on 22 August 1944, three days before liberation of the capital. The first headline was "The victory of Paris is in progress!"(La victoire de Paris est en marche!) The paper changed name to Le Parisien in 1986. The paper grew from the ashes of Le Petit Parisien, a paper founded in 1876 but which had been tainted by collaboration during the second world war. The government closed it, along with other newspapers, and licensed Le Parisien Libéré and L'Humanité to take over the paper's headquarters in the rue d'Enghien.

Strike
Economic problems in the 1970s cost the popular press, including Le Parisien Libéré, much of its readership. On 1 March 1975, Le Parisien Libéré'''s management told workers' representatives of a plan to cut 300 jobs, including those of 200 printers, and to print fewer papers. On 4 March the company closed one of its print works, in the rue d'Enghien in Paris. The unions said they had been given no notice and it led to one of the longest strikes in French newspaper history and to the murder of an innocent man confused with the paper's editor.

Production of the paper was interrupted from 7 March. Amaury refused the claims of his workers. The printers stopped work, helped by colleagues elsewhere in the CGT trade union who gave a tenth of their salary to a strike fund. The printers took over two of the newspapers' plants and barricaded themselves behind rolls of newsprint. After two weeks Amaury had the paper printed in Belgium. Printers hijacked two loads of papers being driven south and threw them into the fields. The rest of the delivery made it to Paris and the newspaper maintained some of its circulation after moving printing to a plant north of Paris  staffed partly by printers from Le Parisien Libéré who belonged to a different union.

Protesters occupied the liner, SS France and scaled the Notre Dame in central Paris to scatter pamphlets and protested at the Tour de France, run by another part of Amaury's organisation.

The episode became more violent when a bomb killed the editor-in-chief of Agence France Presse at his apartment in Paris. An anonymous caller told a local radio station: "We have just blasted the home of Cabanes of Le Parisien Libéré." Bernard Cabanes was unconnected with the dispute; police believed the bomb was intended for  the newspaper's editor, another journalist of the same name. Printers denied involvement. The dispute lasted 29 months.

Tour de France
The Tour de France cycle race began in 1903 to promote the newspaper, L'Auto. The paper was among those closed at Liberation, its property sequestrated by the state. Its editor, Jacques Goddet, had compiled a dossier to show how much his paper had contributed privately to the Resistance even if its public stance had favoured the Germans. Émilien Amaury was among his supporters. Goddet was forbidden to use the name L'Auto, judged to give an unfair advantage over rival sports papers. The new paper took the name L'Équipe instead. It applied successfully to organise the Tour de France.L'Équipe's finances were never secure and in 1968 Amaury bought an interest but maintained Goddet as editor. Amaury's condition was that his own cycling reporter, Félix Lévitan, should share organisation of the Tour. Lévitan slowly took over from Goddet, especially in arrangements for sponsorship and finance. He and Goddet were business partners rather than friends, and Lévitan came into his own when Amaury bought L'Équipe and the Tour. Amaury's death meant ownership passed, after a legal battle, to his son, Philippe. Friction over inheritance (see below) meant Philippe was anxious to change some of the arrangements he had taken over and Lévitan fell out of favour. 

The Tour de France is still run by Amaury Sport Organisation, part of the general Amaury group, which also organises the Dakar car rally and the Paris marathon, now run by Jean-Étienne Amaury, Philippe's son.

Death
Amaury died after falling from his horse in the forest near Chantilly, Oise. The left-wing newspaper Libération reflected the manner in which many of its readers perceived him by the headline Amaury falls from his horse: the horse is safe. His death led to a six-year legal battle over inheritance. Amaury left the bulk of his estate to his daughter, Francine. French law demands that offspring inherit equally and Amaury's son, Philippe, insisted on his share. The legal case was handled by Jacques Trémollet de Villers and six years later it settled amicably, Philippe taking the dailies and his sister magazines such as Marie-France and Point de Vue''.

Émilien Amaury is buried in the Saint-Pierre cemetery at Chantilly.

Notes

References 

1909 births
1977 deaths
People from Étampes
Amaury family
French journalists
20th-century French newspaper publishers (people)
French newspaper chain founders
French newspaper founders
French magazine publishers (people)
French Resistance members
Tour de France people
French male non-fiction writers
Deaths by horse-riding accident in France
20th-century French journalists
20th-century French male writers